John Chapman (November 25, 1928 - May 2, 1980) was one of the most successful trainers and drivers in the sport of harness racing. He died unexpectedly at age 51 shortly after his ongoing career had been recognized with induction into his sport's Halls of Fame in both Canada and the United States. He grew up playing ice hockey and would Captain the Toronto St. Michael's Majors team of the Ontario Junior Hockey League.

References

1928 births
1980 deaths
Toronto St. Michael's Majors players
Canadian harness racing drivers
Canadian Horse Racing Hall of Fame inductees
United States Harness Racing Hall of Fame inductees
Sportspeople from Toronto